Blokland or Van Blokland is a Dutch toponymic surname indicating an origin in either Blokland, Utrecht, Hoogblokland, Laagblokland or Blokland, South Holland. People with the surname include:

 (born 1959), Dutch typeface designer and founder of the Dutch Type Library company
Hans Blokland (politician) (born 1943), Dutch politician and MEP
Hans T. Blokland (born 1960), Dutch social and political theorist
Jenny Blokland (born c.1958), Australian Northern Territory Supreme Court judge
Rogier Blokland (born 1971), Dutch linguist and Professor of Finno-Ugric languages
Talja Blokland (born 1971), Dutch social scientist and urban researcher in Berlin

Van Blokland
Erik van Blokland (born 1967), Dutch typeface designer, educator and computer programmer
Petr van Blokland (born 1956), Dutch graphic and typeface designer

Beelaerts van Blokland
Gerard Jacob Theodoor Beelaerts van Blokland (1843-1897), Speaker of the Dutch House of Representatives and envoy for the South African Republic
Frans Beelaerts van Blokland (1872–1956), Dutch politician and diplomat
Pieter Beelaerts van Blokland (born 1932), Dutch CDA politician, Ministers of Housing and Spatial Planning 1977–81

References

Dutch-language surnames
Dutch toponymic surnames

de:Blokland
fi:Blokland
fr:Blokland